Frank Dominic Bernardi (born June 17, 1933) is a former American football defensive back who played professionally in the  National Football League (NFL) and the American Football League (AFL). He played college football at the University of Colorado at Boulder. A 4th round selection (38th overall pick) in the 1955 NFL Draft, Bernardi played for the NFL's Chicago Cardinals from 1955 through 1957, and for the AFL's Denver Broncos in 1960.

1933 births
Living people
People from Highwood, Illinois
Players of American football from Illinois
Sportspeople from the Chicago metropolitan area
American football defensive backs
Colorado Buffaloes football players
Chicago Cardinals players
Denver Broncos (AFL) players